36 Hours, released in the United States as Terror Street, is a 1953 British film noir directed by Montgomery Tully and starring Dan Duryea. It was made by Hammer Film Productions.

Plot
Bill Rogers (Dan Duryea), an American jet pilot stationed in the USA, goes absent without leave and heads to England to find out why he hasn't heard from his wife lately. He learns details that suggest she has left him and is living a life that involves several male "friends". She shows up to meet him at her new flat, but then he is suddenly knocked unconscious from behind. When he awakes he finds that his wife has been murdered and that he is the prime suspect. With only 36 hours at his disposal, Rogers takes it upon himself to track down the actual killer.

Cast
 Dan Duryea as Major Bill Rogers
 Elsie Albiin as Katherine 'Katie' Rogers
 Gudrun Ure as Sister Jenny Miller
 Eric Pohlmann as Slossen, the smuggler
 John Chandos as Orville Hart
 Kenneth Griffith as Henry Slosson
 Harold Lang as Harry Cross, desk clerk
 Jane Carr as Soup Kitchen Supervisor
 Michael Golden as The Inspector
 Marianne Stone as Pam Palmer
 Russell Napier as Policeman (uncredited)
 Lee Patterson as Joe (Pilot)

References

External links
 
 
 
 

1953 films
1953 crime drama films
British black-and-white films
British crime drama films
Hammer Film Productions films
Lippert Pictures films
Film noir
Films directed by Montgomery Tully
1950s English-language films
1950s British films